The Imam Khomeini metro station is the junction of Tehran Metro Line 1 and Line 2. The station was opened on 21 February 2000, it is located in Imam Khomeini Square between Panzdah-e-Khordad Metro Station and Saadi Metro Station in Line 1 and Mellat Metro Station and Hasan Abad Metro Station in Line 2.

This station is 19 meters underground and has elevator access.

References

Tehran Metro stations
Railway stations opened in 2000